The Governorate of Paraguay, originally called the Governorate of Guayrá, was a governorate of the Spanish Empire and part of the Viceroyalty of Peru.  Its seat was the city of Asunción; its territory roughly encompassed the modern day country of Paraguay.  The Governorate was created on December 16, 1617, by the royal decree of King Philip III as a split of the Governorate of the Río de la Plata and of Paraguay into its respective halves.  The Governorate lasted until 1782, after which the massive Viceroyalty of Peru was split, and Paraguay became an intendency (intendencia) of the new Viceroyalty of the Río de la Plata.

List of governors of Paraguay

References

 
Paraguay

History of Paraguay
Former colonies in South America
Former Spanish colonies
Spanish colonization of the Americas
States and territories established in 1617
1617 establishments in the Viceroyalty of Peru
States and territories disestablished in 1782
1782 disestablishments in the Viceroyalty of Peru
1782 establishments in the Viceroyalty of the Río de la Plata